John Fawkes (born 9 October 1933) is an English former first-class cricketer and British Army officer.

Fawkes was born at Brampton, Derbyshire. He carried out his National Service in the Royal Army Ordnance Corps as a second lieutenant, starting in October 1953. In November 1954, he was transferred from the National Service list and was promoted to the rank of lieutenant. His service took him to Kenya Colony, where he played minor matches for Kenya and East Africa. He later played first-class cricket for the Combined Services cricket team, making his debut against Warwickshire at Birmingham in 1959. He played three further first-class matches for the Combined Services in 1960, playing against Cambridge University, Surrey, and the touring South Africans. He scored 117 runs across his four matches, averaging 19.50, with a high score of 41.

References

External links

1933 births
Living people
People from the Borough of Chesterfield
Cricketers from Derbyshire
Royal Army Ordnance Corps officers
English cricketers
Combined Services cricketers
Military personnel from Derbyshire
20th-century British Army personnel